Quantum Leap is an American science fiction television series aired on NBC. It is a revival of the show created by Donald P. Bellisario, with Steven Lilien & Bryan Wynbrandt developing the new series. Don Bellisario, Steven Lilien & Bryan Wynbrandt executive produce the new series. It takes place 30 years after Dr. Sam Beckett stepped into the Quantum Leap accelerator and after the Season 5 finale where the show left off. The series stars Raymond Lee as new lead character Dr. Ben Song, along with Caitlin Bassett, Mason Alexander Park, Nanrisa Lee, and Ernie Hudson. The series premiered on September 19, 2022. In December 2022, the series was renewed for a second season.

Premise 
Thirty years have passed since Dr. Sam Beckett vanished into the Quantum Leap accelerator. The Quantum Leap project has been restarted with a new team trying to piece together the mysteries behind Beckett and his machine. For reasons unknown, Dr. Ben Song, the new project's lead physicist, has uploaded new program code to the project systems and used the upgraded accelerator to leap back in time. He becomes lost in the past just as Beckett did, living the lives of other people and changing history in hopes of getting back to the present. Project employee Addison Augustine, who is Ben's fiancée, acts as his liaison with the project, appearing to him as a hologram only he can see and hear, just as the previous project's observer Al Calavicci did for Beckett.

Cast

Main 
 Raymond Lee as Ben Song, the lead physicist working on Quantum Leap who gets stuck in the past, leaping into the bodies of different people, while also having partial amnesia about his identity as a result of leaping
 Caitlin Bassett as Addison Augustine, Ben's fiancée and "observer", who helps Ben with finding out what he has to do in order to leap
 Mason Alexander Park as Ian Wright, the non-binary chief architect of the Quantum Leap artificial intelligence
 Nanrisa Lee as Jenn Chou, the Quantum Leap head of security
 Ernie Hudson as Herbert "Magic" Williams, head of the Quantum Leap time travel project, and a Vietnam War veteran who Sam Beckett leaped into in the series' Season 3 1990 episode "The Leap Home (Part 2) – Vietnam". Hudson replaces Christopher Kirby from the original episode.

Recurring
 Georgina Reilly as Janis Calavicci, the daughter of Al Calavicci from the previous series.
 Walter Perez as Richard Martinez / Leaper X

Guest
 Deborah Pratt as Ziggy
 Susan Diol as Beth Calavicci, the wife of Al Calavicci from the previous series.
 Michael Welch as Ryan
 Michael Malarkey as Cole
 Carly Pope as Samantha Stratton
 José Zúñiga as Commander Jim Reynolds
 Álex González as Marco
 Justin Hartley as Jake
 Sofia Pernas as Tammy Jean Jessup
 Mark Damon Espinoza as Alberto Sandoval
 Yaani King Mondschein as Frankie
 Jewel Staite as Naomi Harvey
 Elyse Levesque as Lola Gray
 Josh Meyers as Percival Gray
 Chido Nwokocha as Felix Watts
 Eric Lee Huffman as Adam Sullivan
 Kurt Yaeger as Ringer
 Deborah Ann Woll as Carly Farmer
 Sumalee Montano as Carolina Carlo
 Eugene Byrd as Dr. Harper
 Stan Shaw as Eli Jackson
 François Chau as Louis Tann
 Robert Picardo as Dr. Edwin Woolsey
 Matt Glave as Colonel Jack Parker
 Joe Dinicol as Eugene Wagner
Brandon Routh as Alexander Augustine, Addison's father

Episodes

Production

Development 
In September 2021, Scott Bakula, who played main character Sam Beckett in the series, hinted that a reboot of the show was being considered, with creator Donald P. Bellisario returning in some capacity. A pilot episode was ordered by NBC the following January with plans for writers Steven Lilien and Bryan Wynbrandt to act as showrunners with executive producer Martin Gero and with original series producer and writer Deborah Pratt. Helen Shaver was hired to direct the pilot episode and to serve as an executive producer as well. NBC ordered the sixth season in May after reviewing the test pilot for the new season.

After it received a full season order, Aadrita Mukerji and Dean Georgaris joined as additional executive producers, and Gero took over as showrunner while Lilien and Wynbrandt stayed with the series as executive producers. A new pilot was directed by Thor Freudenthal and written by Lilien and Wynbrandt, with the original pilot being scheduled to air later in the season. The decision not to launch the revival with the original pilot was made in order to provide a better introduction in the season, and it was rescheduled as the sixth episode with some reshoots added for context.

In September 2022, Bakula confirmed that he had been asked by producers to reprise his role as Sam Beckett in the revival but had ultimately decided to not be involved with the new series, saying in a statement on Instagram, "As the show has always been near and dear to my heart, it was a very difficult decision to pass on the project".

After the first three episodes had aired, NBC ordered six additional episodes for the first season, bringing its total to 18 episodes. On December 12, 2022, NBC renewed the series for a second season. initially consisting of 13 episodes, with a possibility of more, and going into production immediately after the first season with no break.

Casting 
Raymond Lee was the first actor cast in the show, taking the lead role as Dr. Ben Song in March 2022. Shortly afterwards, the cast was filled out with Ernie Hudson, Nanrisa Lee, Mason Alexander Park, and Caitlin Bassett, making her television debut. After being ordered to series, Georgina Reilly joined the cast in a recurring role.

Marketing and release 
Quantum Leap (2022) Season 1 premiered on September 19, 2022. The show is available to stream on Peacock and NBC website and NBC app and On-Demand on Comcast/Xfinity System for free with ads.

Reception

Critical response 
The review aggregator website Rotten Tomatoes reported a 55% approval rating with an average rating of 5.3/10, based on 22 critic reviews. The website's critics consensus reads, "This more serialized reboot of Quantum Leap has enough heart to merit a look from viewers with the luxury of time, but it often forgets to have fun with the episodic structure that made the original a classic." On Metacritic, the series has a weighted average score of 56 out of 100 based on eight critics, indicating "mixed or average reviews".

Ratings

Notes

References

External links 
 
 

 
2020s American drama television series
2020s American science fiction television series
2020s American time travel television series
2022 American television series debuts
Alternate history television series
American sequel television series
English-language television shows
Fiction about body swapping
Holography in television
NBC original programming
Television series about being lost from home
Television series by Universal Content Productions
Television series by Universal Television